Noorondu Nenapu is a 2017 Indian Kannada romantic drama film which dates back in the 1980s, directed by Kumaresh M. Story of the film written by Late Shri Suhas Shirvalkar, rewritten and dialogues by Praveen Sutar and screenplay by Chinmay Mandlekar (Marathi). The film is produced by  Suraj Desai and Manish Desai under the banner 3 Lion Production. It is the official remake of Sanjay Jadhav's Marathi film Duniyadari  which was based on the novel of the same name by Suhas Shirvalkar.

Noorondu Nenapu stars Chetan, Meghana Raj, Rajavardan, Sushmita Joshi, Yash Shetty and debutant Rajavardhan  in the lead roles portraying the saga of love and the tale of friendship back in the 1980s.

In August 2016, director Kumaresh M took the Mahurat shot and Bengaluru socialite S K Rao rolled the cameras. Major parts of the movie were shot in Belagavi for its scenic beauty. The view of the college was taken at University of Agricultural Sciences, Dharwad. The sensational music is given by Gagan Baderiya.
The filming of the movie was completed in October 2016 and The first teaser is launched on 1 January 2017.

Cast
Chetan Kumar as Shreyas Bahadur
Meghana Raj as Shruthi Aras
Rajavardan as DSP/Digambar Shankar Patil
Sushmita Joshi as meenakshi
Yash Shetty as Sainath Rao
Archana as Rekha
Rajesh Natranga as MK
Sidlingu Sridhar as Javare Gowda
Veena Sunder as Rani Ma
Sunder as Bahadur

Production
3 Lion Production is an Indian production company established by Suraj Desai and Manish Desai. It is indulged in producing movies and is based in Bangalore.
In 2017, 3 Lion Productions will release a multiple star cast movie Noorondu Nenapu which is a Kannada remake of Sanjay Jadhav's Marathi film Duniyadari. 3 Lion Productions has officially announced to be coming up with various projects down the line.

Soundtrack
Gagan Baderiya composed the film's soundtrack. The soundtrack album consists of 4 tracks.

References

External links

2017 films
Indian romantic drama films
Indian coming-of-age drama films
Kannada remakes of Marathi films
Indian drama road movies
Films set in universities and colleges
2010s Kannada-language films
2010s coming-of-age drama films
2010s drama road movies
2017 romantic drama films